Jim "Jimmy" McCarter (born March 30, 1936 in Chester, PA) was an American football fullback and amateur heavyweight boxer.

Background
McCarter was a fullback for the University of Washington football team.

Amateur career
McCarter fought out of the Lloyd Athletic Club and won the Diamond Belt in Philadelphia and went on to win the National AAU Heavyweight Championship in 1956, reportedly with a decision vs. Sonny Liston.

Pro career
McCarter turned pro in 1959 and enjoyed far less success than as an amateur.  Fighting mostly journeymen, McCarter's pro career was largely over by 1961.  He continued to fight sporadically over the next several years without winning a bout, and finally retired in 1973.

Professional boxing record

|-
|align="center" colspan=8|9 Wins (5 knockouts, 4 decisions), 8 Losses (3 knockouts, 5 decisions), 2 Draws 
|-
| align="center" style="border-style: none none solid solid; background: #e3e3e3"|Result
| align="center" style="border-style: none none solid solid; background: #e3e3e3"|Record
| align="center" style="border-style: none none solid solid; background: #e3e3e3"|Opponent
| align="center" style="border-style: none none solid solid; background: #e3e3e3"|Type
| align="center" style="border-style: none none solid solid; background: #e3e3e3"|Round
| align="center" style="border-style: none none solid solid; background: #e3e3e3"|Date
| align="center" style="border-style: none none solid solid; background: #e3e3e3"|Location
| align="center" style="border-style: none none solid solid; background: #e3e3e3"|Notes
|-align=center
|Loss
|
|align=left| Pedro Agosto
|KO
|2
|14/06/1973
|align=left| Roberto Clemente Coliseum, San Juan, Puerto Rico
|align=left|
|-
|Loss
|
|align=left| Donnie Ray Sherman
|PTS
|6
|20/05/1968
|align=left| Philadelphia Arena, Philadelphia, Pennsylvania
|align=left|
|-
|Loss
|
|align=left| Walter Sterling
|KO
|2
|10/01/1968
|align=left| Oakland Auditorium Arena, Oakland, California
|align=left|
|-
|Loss
|
|align=left| Greatest Crawford
|PTS
|6
|10/07/1964
|align=left| Madison Square Garden, New York City
|align=left|
|-
|Draw
|
|align=left| David E. Bailey
|PTS
|6
|26/03/1963
|align=left| Allentown, Pennsylvania
|align=left|
|-
|Loss
|
|align=left| Alex Miteff
|KO
|3
|31/08/1961
|align=left| Olympic Auditorium, Los Angeles, California
|align=left|
|-
|Win
|
|align=left| Dave Furch
|UD
|10
|22/06/1961
|align=left| Olympic Auditorium, Los Angeles, California
|align=left|
|-
|Win
|
|align=left| Floyd Joyner
|SD
|10
|20/04/1961
|align=left| Olympic Auditorium, Los Angeles, California
|align=left|
|-
|Loss
|
|align=left| Willi Besmanoff
|UD
|10
|18/10/1960
|align=left| Seattle Civic Auditorium, Seattle, Washington
|align=left|
|-
|Loss
|
|align=left| Otis Fuller
|UD
|10
|14/06/1960
|align=left| Olympic Auditorium, Los Angeles, California
|align=left|
|-
|Draw
|
|align=left| Otis Fuller
|PTS
|10
|03/05/1960
|align=left| Olympic Auditorium, Los Angeles, California
|align=left|
|-
|Win
|
|align=left| Eddie Jackson
|RTD
|5
|12/04/1960
|align=left| Olympic Auditorium, Los Angeles, California
|align=left|
|-
|Win
|
|align=left| Yancy D Smith
|TKO
|1
|01/03/1960
|align=left| Olympic Auditorium, Los Angeles, California
|align=left|
|-
|Win
|
|align=left| Duke Sabedong
|MD
|10
|26/01/1960
|align=left| Olympic Auditorium, Los Angeles, California
|align=left|
|-
|Win
|
|align=left| Anthony Emanuel
|KO
|2
|22/12/1959
|align=left| Olympic Auditorium, Los Angeles, California
|align=left|
|-
|Loss
|
|align=left| Jack Jarrod
|SD
|6
|14/11/1959
|align=left| Olympic Auditorium, Los Angeles, California
|align=left|
|-
|Win
|
|align=left| Andy Isaacs
|PTS
|4
|10/10/1959
|align=left| Olympic Auditorium, Los Angeles, California
|align=left|
|-
|Win
|
|align=left| Herbert Hair
|KO
|3
|29/05/1959
|align=left| Legion Stadium, Hollywood, California
|align=left|
|-
|Win
|
|align=left| Bob Mumford
|KO
|4
|16/04/1959
|align=left| Olympic Auditorium, Los Angeles, California
|align=left|
|}

References

External links
 

1936 births
Boxers from Pennsylvania
Heavyweight boxers
Winners of the United States Championship for amateur boxers
Living people
American male boxers